Rineloricaria microlepidogaster is a species of catfish in the family Loricariidae. It is native to South America, where it occurs in the Lagoa dos Patos basin, as well as possibly the Paraná River basin, in Argentina and Brazil. It is typically seen in environments with slow to fast water flow, clear to brown water, and a substrate composed of rocks, sand, or mud, including polluted waters. The species reaches 19.3 cm (7.6 inches) in standard length and is believed to be a facultative air-breather.

References 

Fish described in 1904
Taxa named by Charles Tate Regan
Catfish of South America
Freshwater fish of Argentina
Freshwater fish of Brazil
Loricariini